David Andrew Thornley (31 July 1935 – 18 June 1978) was an Irish Labour Party politician and university professor at Trinity College Dublin.

Life
Born in Surrey, England, the youngest child of Welshman Frederick Edward Thornley and Dublin-born Maud Helen Thornley (née Browne). His parents, both civil servants, met while working in Inland Revenue in Dublin in the 1910s.

He received a BA and PhD at Trinity College Dublin. His PhD was entitled "Isaac Butt and the creation of an Irish parliamentary party (1868–1879)" and was written under the supervision of Theodore William Moody. He was appointed Associate professor of Trinity in 1968. by then he had been working as a presenter on 7 Days since 1963. In 1964 he published the book Isaac Butt and Home Rule.

After joining Labour in 1969 he was elected to Dáil Éireann as a Labour Party Teachta Dála (TD) for the Dublin North-West constituency at the 1969 general election. He confronted the party leader Brendan Corish, who at the time of the Arms Crisis reportedly rejected out of hand any suggestion of military aid or use of force after the outbreak of violence in Northern Ireland.

Thornley considered himself to be "in the mould of James Connolly", being a practising catholic, Marxist and republican.

In December 1972 he called for the immediate release of Seán Mac Stíofáin, then leader of the Provisional IRA. He was re-elected at the 1973 general election. In April 1976, he lost the Labour party whip after appearing on Sinn Féin platform during Easter Rising commemorations. In September 1976, he voted for the Criminal Justice (Jurisdiction) Bill despite misgivings. He told The Irish Times: "When I get very depressed I drink too much. When I voted for the Criminal Justice (Jurisdiction Bill) I went on the batter for a forthnight [sic]." In February 1977, he was re-admitted to the Labour Parliamentary party. He lost his seat at the 1977 general election.

In 1978 he joined the newly formed Socialist Labour Party stating that he had done so because: "There is no man in politics that I respect more than Noël Browne, despite our occasional differences. If the SLP is good for him, it's good enough for me".

Death and legacy
Thornley died in 1978 in County Dublin, aged 42. He is buried in Bohernabreen Cememtery in Dublin. The Trinity College Labour Branch was formerly named the David Thornley Branch in his honour.

Bibliography

References

External links

1935 births
1978 deaths
Irish educators
Labour Party (Ireland) TDs
Members of the 19th Dáil
Members of the 20th Dáil
Academics of Trinity College Dublin
People from Surrey
Politicians from County Dublin
English emigrants to Ireland
Irish socialists
Irish Marxists
Alumni of Trinity College Dublin